Overflight may refer to:
 Transiting of civilian aircraft over the territory of a foreign country
 Freedoms of the air (flyover rights, open skies agreements)
 Freedoms of the air § First freedom
 Surveillance flight over a foreign country's territory
 Aerial reconnaissance (flyover reconnaissance)
 United States aerial reconnaissance of the Soviet Union
 Surveillance aircraft
 Reconnaissance aircraft
 Treaty on Open Skies
 Flypast, a ceremonial flight of military aircraft over a parade ground etc.

See also
 Flyover